Fernanda Trías (Uruguay, 1976) is a Uruguayan author and translator.

Her novels ‘’La Azotea’’ (The Rooftop),  ‘’La ciudad invencible’’ (The Invincible City), and ‘’Mugre rosa’’ (Pink Slime), as well as the short story collection ‘’No soñarás Flores’’ and the chapbook ‘’El regreso’’. Her work has also been included in anthologies in Germany, Colombia, Peru, Spain, Uruguay, the US, and the UK, including 20/40 and Palabras Errantes. Her work has been translated into German, French, Hebrew, English, and Italian so far. La azotea was selected as one of the best books of the year by El País Cultural and was awarded the third prize of the National Uruguayan Literature in 2002. In 2006, she received the BankBoston Foundation Prize for National Culture. She was a friend and student of the Uruguayan writer Mario Levrero and participated in the creation of De los flexes terpines, a collection directed by Levrero that published fifteen titles, almost all by new writers. In the fifth volume of that collection, Trías published her first novella, Cuaderno para solo un ojo.

In 2004, she won the Unesco-Aschberg scholarship for writers and went to France, where she lived for five years. In 2010, She moved to Buenos Aires, where she worked as a translator, reader, and copyeditor for multiple publishing houses. In 2012, she won a scholarship to pursue an MFA in creative writing at New York University. In 2017, she won the first SEGIB-Eñe-Casa de Velázquez Prize and residency in Madrid for her project Mugre rosa. She lives in Bogotá, Colombia, where she has taught at the Universidad Nacional’s creative writing MFA. In 2019, she was selected for the writer-in-residence program at the Universidad de los Andes, where she currently lives and writes. In 2020 she was awarded the national literature prize for Mugre rosa, followed in 2021 by the Premio Bartolomé Hidalgo and the Sor Juana Inés de la Cruz Prize.

References

1976 births
Living people
Uruguayan writers
Uruguayan translators